Sarab-e Bahram (also Romanized as Sarāb-e Bahrām and Sarab Bahram) is a village in Bakesh-e Yek Rural District, in the Central District of Mamasani County, Fars Province, Iran. At the 2006 census, its population was 398, in 80 families.

References 

Populated places in Mamasani County